Jailbird is a novel by Kurt Vonnegut, published in 1979. The book is regarded as Kurt Vonnegut's "Watergate novel."

The novel is narrated by protagonist Walter F. Starbuck, a man recently released from a minimum-security prison in Georgia after serving time for his small role in the Watergate Scandal. Jailbird is written as a standard memoir, revealing Starbuck's present situation, then coming full circle to tell the story of his first two days after being released from prison. Through Starbuck, Jailbird discusses the history of the American labor movement, alongside corporate America, McCarthyism, the Nixon administration, and Watergate.

Jailbird includes a cameo by Kilgore Trout, a recurring Vonnegutian character known for writing science fiction novels and short stories.  Unlike other versions of the character, this "Kilgore Trout" is revealed to be the pseudonym of a character in prison, deliberately contradicting the autobiographical details of Trout's life in other Vonnegut novels. This is an example of Vonnegut using the unreliable narrator narration device.

Literary significance and reception
The New York Times Book Review called Jailbird Vonnegut's "Sermon on the Mount." Kirkus Reviews described the book as "[n]ot top-drawer Vonnegut...but...there's enough of the author's narrative zip to keep fans happy even while the novel fizzles into foolishness."

In a 2013 piece, Jacobin called Jailbird Vonnegut's "most extensive exploration of labor" and "Vonnegut's clearest articulation of sympathies with the labor movement."

Vonnegut himself gave the novel a grade of "A" when grading all of his published works in his book Palm Sunday.

References

1979 American novels
Novels by Kurt Vonnegut
Works about the Watergate scandal